"Get Out of Your Own Way" is a song by Irish rock band U2. It is the fourth track on their fourteenth studio album, Songs of Experience, and was released as the album's second single on 8 December 2017.

Writing and recording
"Get Out of Your Own Way" is lyrically addressed to the daughters of lead vocalist Bono (actress Eve Hewson, and Jordan, both featured on the cover), with words of encouragement to not be one's own worst enemy. The lyrics also reference the US political crisis, mentioning Liberty receiving a "smack in the mouth". Musically, the song was compared to the band's 2000 single "Beautiful Day". Seguing between the end of "Get Out of Your Own Way" and the beginning of the album's next track, "American Soul", is a spoken word segment by rapper Kendrick Lamar; playing what Bono called a "cracked preacher", Lamar gives an ironic take on the Beatitudes.

Release and promotion
On 1 November 2017, the band officially announced details of the album's release; as part of the announcement, "Get Out of Your Own Way" was one of two songs released on music streaming services. Those who pre-ordered the album received "instant grat downloads" of "Get Out of Your Own Way" and other songs. U2 performed "Get Out of Your Own Way" on the 2 December 2017 episode of American comedy television series Saturday Night Live.

"Get Out of Your Own Way" was released as the album's second single on 16 January 2018, with the song's music video following two days later. For the 60th Annual Grammy Awards, U2 pre-recorded the performance of "Get Out of Your Own Way" on a barge in front of the Statue of Liberty.

After the single release of "Get Out of Your Own Way", several remixes of the song were issued by Afrojack and Switch.

Charts

Weekly charts

Year-end charts

Release history

References

U2 songs
Songs written by Bono
Songs written by the Edge
Songs written by Adam Clayton
Songs written by Larry Mullen Jr.
2017 songs
2018 singles
Song recordings produced by Ryan Tedder
Song recordings produced by Steve Lillywhite
Song recordings produced by Jacknife Lee